Renhe may refer to the following places in China:

Ren River, a river in Chongqing, Sichuan, and Shaanxi, the longest tributary of Han River system
Renhe District, a district of Panzhihua, Sichuan

Towns, townships, and subdistricts
Chongqing
Renhe Subdistrict, Yubei District, a subdistrict in Yubei District
Renhe Subdistrict, Yunyang County, a subdistrict in Yunyang County

Guangdong
Renhe, Guangdong, a town in Guangzhou

Guizhou
Renhe Yi and Miao Ethnic Township, a township in Qianxi County

Henan
Renhe, Huangchuan County, a town in Huangchuan County
Renhe, Minquan County, a town in Minquan County
Renhe Subdistrict, Zhoukou, a subdistrict in Chuanhui District, Zhoukou

Hunan
Renhe, Ningyuan County, a town in Ningyuan County
Renhe Township, Xiping County, a township in Xiping County

Jiangxi
Renhe, Xiajiang County, a town in Xiajiang County
Renhe Township, Xinyu, a township in Xinyu

Shandong
Renhe, Weihai, a town in Rongcheng, Weihai
Renhe Subdistrict, Gaotang County, a subdistrict in Gaotang County

Sichuan
Renhe, Renhe District, a town in Renhe District
Renhe, Shehong County, a town in Shehong County
Renhe, Xichong County, a town in Xichong County
Renhe, Zitong County, a town in Zitong County
Renhe Township, Chengdu, a township in Chengdu
Renhe Township, Dazhu County, a township in Dazhu County
Renhe Township, Anyue County, a township in Anyue County
Renhe Township, Linshui County, a township in Linshui County
Renhe Township, Jiang'an County, a township in Jiang'an County
Renhe Township, Nanjiang County, a township in Nanjiang County

Yunnan
Renhe, Maguan County, in Maguan County, Yunnan
Renhe, Shidian County, in Shidian County, Yunnan
Renhe, Yongsheng County, in Yongsheng County, Yunnan

Zhejiang
Renhe Subdistrict, Hangzhou, a subdistrict in Yuhang District, Hangzhou